Suibin County is a county of eastern Heilongjiang province, People's Republic of China, bordering Russia's Jewish Autonomous Oblast to the north across the Amur River. It is the easternmost county-level division of the prefecture-level city of Hegang.

It borders the Heilongjiang divisions of Tongjiang to the east, Fujin to the southeast, Huachuan County to the southwest, and Luobei County to the west.

Administrative divisions 
Suibin County is divided into 3 towns and 6 townships. 
3 towns
 Suibin, Suidong, Zhongren
6 townships
 Liansheng, Beigang, Fuqiang, Beishan, Fuxing, Xinfu

Demographics 

Climate

Notes and references

External links
  Government site - 

Suibin